|}

The Prix du Palais-Royal is a Group 3 flat horse race in France open to thoroughbreds aged three years or older. It is run at Longchamp over a distance of 1,400 metres (about 7 furlongs), and it is scheduled to take place each year in late May or early June.

The event is named after the Palais-Royal, a palace and an associated garden located in Paris. The race was established in 1968, and with four exceptions — the 1996 and 2016 runnings at Deauville, the 2017 running at Maisons-Laffitte and the 2020 running at Clairefontaine — it has always taken place at Longchamp. Its distance has remained at 1,400 metres since its creation.

For several years before its launch there was an event titled the Prix Palais Royal at Saint-Cloud. This was named after a racehorse called Palais Royal, the winner of the Cambridgeshire Handicap and runner-up in the St Leger in 1928.

Records
Most successful horse (2 wins):
 Garnica – 2007, 2008

Leading jockey (5 wins):
 Freddy Head – Regent Street (1969), Prince Mab (1981), Honeyland (1983), Funambule (1990), Robin des Pins (1992)
 Cash Asmussen – Bon Vent (1988), Polish Precedent (1989), Polski Boy (1991), Voleris (1993), Cherokee Rose (1995)

Leading trainer (6 wins):
 André Fabre – Bon Vent (1988), Polish Precedent (1989), Lunasalt (2001), Art Master (2005), Inns of Court (2017), Egot (2022)

Leading owner (4 wins):
 Daniel Wildenstein – African Sky (1973), Gravelines (1976), Bon Vent (1988), Blu Air Force (2000)

Winners since 1980

Earlier winners

 1968: Holy Smoke
 1969: Regent Street
 1970: Yellow God
 1971: Assouan
 1972: Hadrianus
 1973: African Sky
 1974: Sincerely
 1975: Dandy Lute
 1976: Gravelines
 1977: Diligo
 1978: Pas de Deux
 1979: By the Sea

See also
 List of French flat horse races

References
 France Galop / Racing Post:

 france-galop.com – A Brief History: Prix du Palais Royal.
 galopp-sieger.de – Prix du Palais Royal.
 horseracingintfed.com – International Federation of Horseracing Authorities – Prix du Palais-Royal (2016).
 pedigreequery.com – Prix du Palais Royal – Longchamp.

Open mile category horse races
Longchamp Racecourse
Horse races in France
Recurring sporting events established in 1968